The blinking broad-blazed slider (Lerista connivens)  is a species of skink found in Western Australia.

References

Lerista
Reptiles described in 1971
Taxa named by Glen Milton Storr